Harry Kalahiki (1928 – March 31, 1991) was a Hawaiian musician.  He was a 'ukulele virtuoso.  His 1960 album "Mungo Plays Ukulele" is regarded as the first album of instrumental ukulele music. The album was re-issued in 2012.

References

Hawaiian ukulele players
1928 births
1991 deaths
Musicians from Hawaii
20th-century American musicians